Recoleta, also known as Rothery, is a historic home located at Charlottesville, Virginia. It was built in 1940, and is a two- to three-story, "U"-shaped, Spanish Colonial Revival style dwelling.  The house is constructed of stuccoed reinforced cinder block and has a red tile gable roof, arched openings, an exterior stair, a balcony, and steel-framed casement windows.  The "U" contains a patio enclosed by a loggia with a garden front.  Also on the property is a contributing garden enclosed by a cinder block wall built in 1946 that incorporates a fountain wall with a tile roof, circular lantern niches, and a patio.  The house was built for University of Virginia music professor Harry Rogers Pratt and his wife, Agnes Edwards Rothery Pratt.

It was listed on the National Register of Historic Places in 2004.

References

Houses on the National Register of Historic Places in Virginia
Colonial Revival architecture in Virginia
Houses completed in 1940
Houses in Charlottesville, Virginia
National Register of Historic Places in Charlottesville, Virginia